Thabiso Baholo (born 21 February 1990) is a Basotho swimmer.

Career
Baholo first competed for Lesotho at the 2007 World Championships in Melbourne where he finished 97th in the 50 metre backstroke in 43.67, 169th in the 100 metre freestyle in 1:22.04 and with Boipelo Makhothi, Lehlohonolo Moromella and Seele Benjamin Ntai finished 29th in the 4 × 100 metre freestyle relay in 5:42.96.

At the 2008 Commonwealth Youth Games in Pune, India, Baholo finished 21st in the 50 metre breaststroke in 42.38, 37th in the 100 metre freestyle in 1:22.62 and was disqualified in the 50 metre freestyle.

References

1990 births
Living people
Lesotho male swimmers
Male backstroke swimmers
Male breaststroke swimmers
Lesotho male freestyle swimmers